"Love's Been A Little Bit Hard On Me" is a song written by Gary Burr and recorded by the American country-pop singer Juice Newton for her album Quiet Lies.  The recording garnered Newton a Grammy nomination for Best Female Vocalist in the Pop category.

Music video
The music video for this song comically plays off the emotional hurt of love by showing Juice Newton being physically injured by her lover in a series of accidents.  The final shot is of Newton singing in the hospital in a full-body cast with her broken leg in the air. The video was awarded Video of the Year by the American Video Association in 1982.

Personnel
Philip Aaberg – keyboards
Michael Boddicker – synthesizer
George Doering – guitar
Steve Forman – percussion
Andrew Gold – electric guitar and solo, backing vocals
Chris  – backing vocals 
Juice Newton – guitar (uncredited on LP), lead vocals
Rick Shlosser – drums
Harry Stinson – backing vocals
Neil Stubenhaus – bass
Fred Tackett – acoustic guitar
Otha Young – electric guitar, backing vocals

Musical analysis
Newton's version is in A major, and uses primarily A, D, and E chords with an occasional F# minor.  But in the introduction, outro, and interludes between verses, a rarely heard (in popular music) pedal point is used in the bass and rhythm guitars, under changing chords in the upper instruments (A, D, E, A).  Also of interest is the use of a descending parallel pattern of the chords D, C# minor, B minor, and A in the Bridge, which is also atypical of popular music from that era.  The second Bridge also includes a moment of a capella singing, similar to another Newton favorite, Queen of Hearts.

Chart performance
"Love's Been A Little Bit Hard On Me" was released as the album's first single in May 1982 and reached #7 on the Billboard Hot 100 that summer. It also charted at #4 on the Billboard Adult Contemporary chart and #30 on the Billboard Country chart.

Weekly charts

Year-end charts

References

1982 songs
1982 singles
Juice Newton songs
Songs written by Gary Burr
Song recordings produced by Richard Landis
Capitol Records singles